The Order of Merit of Philip the Magnanimous was an order of chivalry established by Louis II, Grand Duke of Hesse on 1 May 1840, the name day of Philip I, Landgrave of Hesse, in his honour to award extraordinary military or civil merit. It was the second-highest order of the Grand Duchy of Hesse before 1876, when it was displaced to third by the revived Order of the Golden Lion, the former paramount order of the Electorate of Hesse.

After the First World War and the fall of the German monarchies, the order—along with all other grand ducal decorations—was formally abolished in 1919.

Overview 
The order was initially divided into four grades: Grand Cross, Commanders 1st and 2nd classes, and knight. On the anniversary of its founding in 1849, a new class was created, the Silver Cross, with the introduction of crossed swords in gold or silver for the class. From 10 November 1859 the knight class was further divided into two grades, 1st and 2nd classes. In 1876, the order was renamed the "Grand Ducal Hessian Order of Philip", though that decree was withdrawn a year later.

From 1881, the order could be awarded with a golden crown, as a special distinction; the order with swords for military merit was from 1893 restricted to those with outstanding achievements during war. In 1900, another new class, the Cross of Honour was created, which was below commander 2nd class and above knight 1st class. A final revision was made on 17 June 1911, with golden rays added to the cross arms of the Commander 1st Class grade.

Recipients

Grand Crosses 

 Alexander II of Russia
 Alexander of Battenberg
 Alexander, Prince of Erbach-Schönberg
 Prince Alexander of Hesse and by Rhine
 Alfred, Duke of Saxe-Coburg and Gotha
 Prince Arthur, Duke of Connaught and Strathearn
 Friedrich von Beck-Rzikowsky
 Theobald von Bethmann Hollweg
 Julius von Bose
 Otto von Bismarck
 Bernhard von Bülow
 Stephan Burián von Rajecz
 Alexander Mountbatten, 1st Marquess of Carisbrooke
 Prince Charles of Hesse and by Rhine
 Rudolf von Delbrück
 Edward VII
 Karl von Einem
 Hermann von Eichhorn
 Woldemar Freedericksz
 Josias von Heeringen
 Georg von Hertling
 Hans Heinrich XV von Hochberg
 Dietrich von Hülsen-Haeseler
 Emich, Prince of Leiningen
 Prince Ernest Augustus, 3rd Duke of Cumberland and Teviotdale
 Ernest Louis, Grand Duke of Hesse
 Ferdinand, Landgrave of Hesse-Homburg
 Prince Francis Joseph of Battenberg
 Ganga Singh
 Georg Donatus, Hereditary Grand Duke of Hesse
 Heinrich von Gagern
 Heinrich von Heß
 Gustav, Landgrave of Hesse-Homburg
 Gustav, Prince of Vasa
 Prince Henry of Battenberg
 Kamehameha V
 Prince Leopold, Duke of Albany
 Louis II, Grand Duke of Hesse
 Louis III, Grand Duke of Hesse
 Louis IV, Grand Duke of Hesse
 Prince Louis of Battenberg
 Madho Rao Scindia
 Moriz von Lyncker
 Edwin Freiherr von Manteuffel
 Georg Alexander von Müller
 Jean-Baptiste Nothomb
 Hugo von Radolin
 Gustav Waldemar von Rauch
 Karl von Schlitz
 Friedrich von Scholl
 Gustav von Senden-Bibran
 Otto Graf zu Stolberg-Wernigerode
 Prince Frederick William of Hesse-Kassel
 Alfred von Tirpitz
 Illarion Vorontsov-Dashkov
 Wilhelm von Wedell-Piesdorf
 Wilhelm I, German Emperor
 Ferdinand von Zeppelin

Commanders 1st Class 

 Alfred Mordaunt Egerton
 Antoni Wilhelm Radziwiłł
 Leopold von Ranke
 Ludwig Freiherr von und zu der Tann-Rathsamhausen
 Karl von Wedel

Commanders 2nd Class 

 August von Heeringen
 Paul Bronsart von Schellendorff
 Walther Bronsart von Schellendorff
 August von Mackensen
 Otto von Marchtaler
 Georg von der Marwitz
 Helmuth von Moltke the Younger
 Ernst von Prittwitz und Gaffron

Crosses of Honour 

 Eberhard Graf von Schmettow

Knights 1st class 

 Heinrich Bone
 George Victor, Prince of Waldeck and Pyrmont
 Oskar von Hutier

Others 

 Grand Duke Nicholas Mikhailovich of Russia
 Princess Victoria Melita of Saxe-Coburg and Gotha

References

Literature
Jörg Nimmergut: Deutsche Orden und Ehrenzeichen bis 1945, Band I – Anhalt-Hohenzollern, Zentralstelle für wissenschaftliche Ordenskunde, München 1997, 

Orders, decorations, and medals of Hesse
House of Hesse-Kassel
1840 establishments in the Grand Duchy of Hesse
Awards established in 1840